Podoglyphus is a genus of mites in the family Acaridae.

Species
 Podoglyphus buski (Murray, 1877)

References

Acaridae